Panormus or Panormos was a harbour at the extremity of the Thracian Chersonesus, in ancient Thrace opposite to the promontory of Sigeum (Cape Kumkale).

References

Populated places in ancient Thrace
Former populated places in Turkey
Lost ancient cities and towns